Chinese Caribbeans (sometimes Sino-Caribbeans) are people of Han Chinese ethnic origin living in the Caribbean. There are small but significant populations of Chinese and their descendants in all countries of the Greater Antilles. They are all part of the large Chinese diaspora known as Overseas Chinese.

Sub-groups

Caribbean Islands:
 Chinese Cubans
 Ethnic Chinese in the Dominican Republic
 Chinese Haitians
 Chinese Jamaicans
 Chinese immigration to Puerto Rico
 Chinese Trinidadian and Tobagonian

Mainland Caribbean:
 Ethnic Chinese in Belize
 Chinese Guyanese
 Chinese Surinamese

Migration history

Enslavement 
Between 1853 and 1879, 14,000 Chinese slaves were imported to the British Caribbean as part of a larger system of low-wage labor bound for the sugar plantations. Imported as a low-wage labor force from China, Chinese settled in three main locations: Jamaica, Trinidad, and British Guiana (now Guyana), initially working on the sugar plantations.  Most of the Chinese slaves initially went to British Guiana; however when importation ended in 1879, the population declined steadily, mostly due to emigration to Trinidad and Suriname.

Chinese immigration to Cuba started in 1847 when Cantonese low-wage workers were brought to work in the sugar fields, bringing their native Chinese folk religion with them.  Hundreds of thousands of Chinese slaves were brought in from Hong Kong, Macau, and Taiwan during the following decades to replace and / or work alongside African slaves.  After obtaining their freedom, some descendants of Chinese slaves settled permanently in Cuba, although most longed for repatriation to their homeland. When the United States enacted the Chinese Exclusion Act on May 6, 1882, many Chinese in the United States fled to Puerto Rico, Cuba and other Latin American nations. They established small niches and worked in restaurants and laundries.

British West Indies 
The Chinese slaves who entered the British West Indies in the middle and late nineteenth century formed a marginal but distinct part of the global dispersal of southern Chinese characteristics of the period. Next to those in the United States, on the one hand, and in Cuba and Peru, on the other, they formed the third largest regional grouping of Chinese arrivals to the Western Hemisphere in the mid-century. About 15,000 arrived in British Guiana, with just under 3,000 going to Trinidad and Jamaica, to work as indentured laborers in the sugar industry.

Although the patterns of their entry into these new societies represented a microcosmic version of the story of the Chinese diaspora in the nineteenth century, there were a number of note-worthy distinctive traits attached to this regional experience.

The bulk of Chinese coolies migration to the West Indies occurred between 1853 and 1866. By the end of the nineteenth century, some 18,000 Chinese would arrive in the West Indies, with the vast majority of those slaves headed for Guyana. As was the case with most migration out of China in the nineteenth century, the slaves were drawn from southern China and were seeking to escape desperate conditions caused by a combination of environmental catastrophes and political unrest.

There were also a considerable number of Christian converts among the Chinese migrants as a result of the colonial government's willingness to rely on Christian missionaries to assist them in their recruitment endeavors, particularly in the recruiting of family units. The use of Christian missionaries in recruitment was just one of many measures that the colonial government used in its venture to avoid accusations that indenture was simply another form of slavery. The government was particularly sensitive to such accusations because it was competing directly with other European powers, particularly Spain, to recruit low-wage laborers from China. The recruitment of Chinese slaves was generally conducted by professional recruiters, known as "crimps", who were paid per individual recruit, while the recruits themselves received a cash advance. In the 1850s, the demand for Chinese slave and the fees paid to the crimps increased so dramatically that the system quickly became notorious for its association with abuse and coercion, including kidnapping.  The system was said to be known as "the sale of Little Pigs", alluding to the inhumane treatment migrants often faced.

The exposure of this inhumane system led to a series of ordinances being passed which, despite not directly enhancing the state of indentured Chinese, eventually played a key role in ending Chinese slavery in the West Indies. In 1866, the Kung Convention signed in China, but never ratified in Britain, specifically provided back passage for the Chinese slaves. West Indian planters were not, however, prepared to cover the additional cost that this would incur, especially in light of the fact that India was proving more than sufficient as a source of coolie. After the Chinese government refused to back down on the provision, interest in the Chinese Caribbeans as slaves seems to have simply faded.

Representations 
The manner in which the colonial powers introduced Chinese into the West Indies and the socioeconomic roles that they afforded to the migrants would directly affect how the Caribbean Chinese were imagined and represented in colonial discourse in terms of where they belonged in the West Indies' social, economic and political landscapes.

The Caribbean Chinese in literature, particularly, were regarded as either valuable additions to the multicultural mosaic of the Caribbean, or an entry into the problematic multiculturalism that existed in the region. George Lamming, for example, in his work Of Age and Innocence and Wilson Harris in The Whole Armour explored the Chinese character through the lens of the former. More often than not, the Caribbean Chinese are presented as peripheral figures in stereotypical roles, as inscrutable or clever or linguistically deficient rural shopkeepers, preoccupied with money and profit. Such characters appear in the novels of Samuel Selvon, Michael Anthony, V.S. Naipaul, and even in the short stories of the Chinese Trinidadian Willi Chen.

The distance from other Caribbeans that is attributed to Chinese in literary texts also manifests itself in the depiction of the Chinese as being a fundamentally alien presence in the West Indies. Indeed, Chinese characters are sometimes depicted as the only individuals who can see the larger themes and issues within the West Indian experience because of their purported distance from them. This can be seen in novels such as Pan Beat by Marion Patrick Jones, Mr. On Loong by Robert Standish, and The Pagoda by Patricia Powell.

Notable people 
Politics and government

 Lee Mark Chang, President of the Senate of Belize
 Arthur Chung, first President of Guyana
 Eugene Chen, former foreign minister of China in the 1920s.
 Solomon Hochoy, last British Governor and first Governor General of Trinidad and Tobago.
 Franklin Khan, former Member of Parliament, Senator, Cabinet Minister, Chairman of the PNM
 George Maxwell Richards, former President of Trinidad and Tobago
 Michael J. Williams, former President of the Senate of Trinidad and Tobago.
 Ronald J. Williams, former Senator, Member of Parliament and Minister of State Enterprises, former Member of the Federal Parliament.
 Gerald Yetming, former Senator, Member of Parliament, Minister of Finance
 Stuart Young, politician and lawyer; Minister of National Security and former Attorney General of Trinidad and Tobago

Business and industry
 Chang Hong Wing - businessman and founder of Hong Wing's coffee
 John Lee Lum, businessman and oil-industry pioneer.
 Carlton K. Mack, grocer and philanthropist.
 William H. Scott, businessman.
 Louis Jay Williams, businessman.

Arts and entertainment

 Sybil Atteck, painter.
 Edwin Ayoung, calypsonian known by the sobriquet Crazy.
 Anya Ayoung-Chee, Miss Trinidad & Tobago/Universe 2008, model, fashion designer and winner of season 9 of Project Runway
 Carlyle Chang Kezia, sculptor, painter and designer; designed the flag and coat of arms of Trinidad and Tobago.
 Raymond Choo Kong, actor, producer, director.
 Patrick Jones, calypsonian known by the sobriquet Cromwell, the Lord Protector and mas' pioneer.
 Wifredo Lam, painter
 Stephen and Elsie Lee Heung, Carnival bandleaders.
 Stephanie Lee Pack, Miss Trinidad and Tobago/Universe 1974
 Amy Leong Pang, artist
 André Tanker, musician and composer.
 Chris Wong Won, better known as Fresh Kid Ice; founding member of 2 Live Crew.

Science and medicine

 Dr. Bert Achong, co-discoverer of the Epstein-Barr virus.
 Fr. Arthur Lai Fook, educator and cleric.
 Dr. Joseph Lennox Pawan, discoverer of the transmission of rabies by vampire bats.
 Dr. David Picou.
 Dr. Theodosius Poon-King.
 Dr. Oswald Siung.

Sports

 Ellis Achong, first Test cricketer of Chinese descent
 Richard Chin A Poo, former national footballer
 David Chin Leung, karate pioneer, first Caribbean JKA judge
 Rupert Tang Choon, Trinidad cricketer, 1940s to 1950s
 Darwin LeonJohn, {Dharma Name Shi Heng Xin} Elite Martial Arts Teacher
 Bert Manhin, winner of Trinidad and Tobago's first medal in shooting (1978 Commonwealth Games)
 Tahith Chong
 Jayde Riviere
 Cornel Chin-Sue
 Cerezo Fung a Wing
Other

 James Chow Bing Quan, first President of Chinese Association 1913, first President of Trinidad branch of Chee Kung Tong 1915/The Chinese FreeMasons of Trinidad (18)
 Kwailan La Borde, sailor; together with her husband Harold La Borde and son Pierre, the first Trinidadian to circumnavigate the globe.
 Lyle Townsend, Former Secretary-General, Communication Workers' Union

See also 

 Coolie
 Overseas Chinese
 Chinese emigration
 Caribbean Chinese cuisine
 Chinese Trinidadian and Tobagonian
 Chinese Exclusion Act

References

 
Ethnic groups in the Caribbean
Chinese diaspora